The 1916 Iowa gubernatorial election was held on November 7, 1916. Republican nominee William L. Harding defeated Democratic nominee Edwin T. Meredith with 61.03% of the vote.

General election

Candidates
Major party candidates
William L. Harding, Republican
Edwin T. Meredith, Democratic 

Other candidates
John W. Bennett, Socialist
Oren D. Ellett, Prohibition
Stephen H. Bashor, Progressive
Arthur S. Dowler, Socialist Labor

Results

References

1916
Iowa
Gubernatorial